Red dwarf rasbora (Microrasbora rubescens) is a species of cyprinid found endemic to Lake Inle in Shan State in Myanmar. It belongs to the genus Microrasbora, which contains two small species of danionins.

Description
Its meristics are that there are 2 spines and 6-7 soft rays in the dorsal fin and 3 spines and 10-12 soft rays in the anal fin. The females are less instensly coloured than the males and are larger and have a much deeper body.

Habitat
The dwarf red rasbora is endemic to Lake Inle which is situated in a valley where the rocks form a karst and which lies 900m above sea level in the Shan Plateau  region of Shan State.  Within the lake this species can be found in the midwater and in the marginal waters of Lake Inle where it is associated with submerged vegetation and forms large schools.

Conservation
The red dwarf rasbora is exploited for the aquarium trade and it is thought this may have some impact on the population. It is also threatened by the introduction of exotic fish species to the lake, particularly Parambassis and Tilapia species, which act as both predators on and competitors with the red dwarf rasbora.  In addition the lake has been polluted from a number of sources, especially from the growing human population in settlements around the lake, while sedimentation and agricultural runoff enters the lake from its drainage basin. The invasive water hyacinth has covered large areas of the lake and this has reduced the area of open water in the lake, this effect being exacerbated by  water abstraction and sedimentation.

References

Taxa named by Nelson Annandale 
Fish described in 1918
Danios
Microrasbora
Fish of Myanmar